Norman Hall (originally known as P. K. Yonge Laboratory School) is an historic academic building on the eastern campus of the University of Florida in Gainesville, Florida.  It was designed by architect Rudolph Weaver in the Collegiate Gothic style, and built in 1932.  It originally housed the university's research and development primary and secondary schools, but now is the principal building of the university's College of Education.  It is located on U.S. 441, near the southwest corner of S.W. 3rd Avenue and S.W. 12th Street in Gainesville.  On January 26, 1990, it was added to the U.S. National Register of Historic Places.

Images

Namesake 

Norman Hall is named for James W. Norman, former dean of the College of Education.  The P.K. Yonge Laboratory School was named for P.K. Yonge, a prominent businessman who was a member of the Florida Board of Control during the formative years of the University of Florida and the state university system.

See also 

Buildings at the University of Florida
History of the University of Florida
University of Florida College of Education

References

External links 

 Alachua County listings at National Register of Historic Places
 Alachua County listings at Florida's Office of Cultural and Historical Programs
 Virtual tour of University of Florida Campus Historic District at Alachua County's Department of Growth Management
 The University of Florida Historic Campus at UF Facilities Planning & Construction
 George A. Smathers Libraries
 UF Builds: The Architecture of the University of Florida
 Old P. K. Yonge Laboratory School

National Register of Historic Places in Gainesville, Florida
Buildings at the University of Florida
Rudolph Weaver buildings
University and college buildings on the National Register of Historic Places in Florida
1932 establishments in Florida
University and college buildings completed in 1932